Langston is a town in Logan County, Oklahoma, United States, and is part of the Oklahoma City Metropolitan Statistical Area. The population was 1,724 at the 2010 census, an increase of 3.2 percent from the figure of 1,670 in 2000. Langston is home to Langston University, the only historically black college in Oklahoma.

History
Langston was founded on April 22, 1890, by Edward P. McCabe, an African-American political figure from Kansas. McCabe helped lead a migration of black settlers from southern U.S. states who hoped to escape discrimination by creating a majority-black state in what was then the Territory of Oklahoma. He named the town for John Mercer Langston, a black member of the 51st United States Congress from Virginia. McCabe used traveling salesmen and African-American newspapers to advertise lots for sale in Langston, and the deeds which accompanied the sale of these lots stipulated that their re-sale could only be to other African-Americans.

Langston was an all black town, one of fifty identifiable black towns and settlements created in Oklahoma between 1865 to 1920.

By 1891, Langston had a population of 200, which included a preacher, doctor, and schoolteacher. By 1892, the town had 25 businesses, with a bank and a public school. A Roman Catholic mission was established in 1893 by Rev. Bishop Theophile Meerschaert and the Benedictine Sisters. The town had a telephone system in service in 1895. In 1897, the Oklahoma Territorial Legislature passed a law creating the Colored Agricultural and Normal University at Langston (which later became Langston University).

Geography

Demographics

As of the census of 2000, there were 1,670 people, 199 households, and 92 families residing in the town. There were 246 housing units at an average density of 132.1 per square mile (51.1/km2). The racial makeup of the town was 3.29% White, 93.29% African American, 1.26% Native American, 0.24% from other races, and 1.92% from two or more races. Hispanic or Latino of any race were 1.32% of the population.

There were 199 households, out of which 27.6% had children under the age of 18 living with them, 16.1% were married couples living together, 27.1% had a female householder with no husband present, and 53.3% were non-families. 37.7% of all households were made up of individuals, and 12.6% had someone living alone who was 65 years of age or older. The average household size was 2.25 and the average family size was 3.14.

In the town, the population was spread out, with 7.6% under the age of 18, 75.3% from 18 to 24, 8.4% from 25 to 44, 4.9% from 45 to 64, and 3.8% who were 65 years of age or older. The median age was 21 years. For every 100 females, there were 86.4 males. For every 100 females age 18 and over, there were 85.9 males.

The median income for a household in the town was $14,722, and the median income for a family was $26,042. Males had a median income of $23,750 versus $20,417 for females. The per capita income for the town was $17,602. About 23.5% of families and 33.8% of the population were below the poverty line, including 26.1% of those under age 18 and 40.0% of those age 65 or over.

Politics
In the 2016 presidential election, the city gave over 90% of the vote to the Democratic Party candidate Hillary Clinton. Despite Logan County voting over 70% for Republican Donald Trump, the heavy black majority in Langston carried the city for Clinton.  Gary Johnson received more votes than Donald Trump in the precinct containing Langston University.

See also

Boley, Brooksville, Clearview, Grayson, Lima, Redbird, Rentiesville, Summit, Taft, Tatums, Tullahassee, and Vernon, other "All-Black" settlements that were part of the Land Run of 1889.

Langston University

Notes

References

External links

 From Sodom to the Promised Land: E.P. McCabe and the Movement for Oklahoma Colonization
 All-Black Towns in Oklahoma from the Oklahoma Historical Society
 Langston City Herald newspaper  hosted by the Gateway to Oklahoma History

Oklahoma City metropolitan area
Towns in Logan County, Oklahoma
Towns in Oklahoma
Pre-statehood history of Oklahoma
Populated places established in 1890
Populated places in Oklahoma established by African Americans